The 2004 Cupa României Final was the 66th final of Romania's most prestigious cup competition. The final was played at the Stadionul Cotroceni in Bucharest on 6 June 2004 and was contested between Divizia A sides Dinamo București and Oţelul Galaţi. The cup was won by Dinamo.

Route to the final

Match details

References

External links
 Official site 

Cupa Romaniei Final, 2004
2003-04
2004